Route 744 is located entirely within the city limits of Springfield, in the U.S. state of Missouri, where it is known locally as Kearney Street. Its western terminus is at the Springfield–Branson National Airport. Its eastern terminus is at Interstate 44 (I-44). The section east of Glenstone Avenue (Business Loop 44) is part of historic U.S. Route 66 (US 66). The section between Glenstone and West Bypass (US 160) was a part of US 66 Bypass. Route 744 was numbered after nearby I-44.

Major intersections

See also

References 

744
Transportation in Greene County, Missouri
Transportation in Springfield, Missouri
744